Tudor Hall, also known as Lockerman House, is a historic home located at Upper Fairmount, Somerset County, Maryland, United States. It is a -story beaded clapboard house, three bays wide by three deep, and built about 1780.  The house features a brick colonnade, now in ruins.

Tudor Hall was listed on the National Register of Historic Places in 1974.

References

External links
, including photo from 1985, at Maryland Historical Trust

Houses in Somerset County, Maryland
Houses on the National Register of Historic Places in Maryland
Houses completed in 1780
National Register of Historic Places in Somerset County, Maryland